HMS Warspite was an  first-class armoured cruiser, launched on 29 January 1884 and commissioned in 1886.

Construction
Morris states that Warspite had her sailing rig removed while building. The illustration of her with masts therefore shows her on trials, or is conjectural.

Service history
Warspite was the flagship on the Pacific Station between 1890 and 1893, then a port guard ship at Queenstown until 1896. From 1896 until 1902 she again served as the flagship of the Pacific Station. Captain Thomas Philip Walker was appointed in command in March 1899, when Rear-Admiral Henry Palliser was Commander-in-Chief of the station. In June 1899 she became the flagship of Rear-Admiral Lewis Beaumont, who kept Captain Walker as flag captain. The ship visited Coquimbo in March 1900. From late 1900 she was the flagship of Rear-Admiral Andrew Bickford, with Captain Colin Richard Keppel as flag captain in command of the ship.  In late March 1902, Rear-Admiral Bickford transferred his flag to the newly arrived , and was joined by Captain Keppel. Warspite returned home under the command of Captain John Locke Marx (who had arrived on Grafton), stopping at Bahia and São Vicente, Cape Verde on the way. She arrived at Plymouth on 28 May 1902, and paid off at Chatham on 1 July, when she was placed in the D Division of the Dockyard reserve and prepared for emergency service.

She was sold on 4 April 1904 to Thos. W. Ward of Preston.  She arrived on the River Mersey on 3 October 1905 and then travelled on to Preston for breaking up.

Notes

References

External links

 Battleship Cruisers - HMS Warspite and HMS Imperieuse

 

Imperieuse-class cruisers
Ships built in Chatham
1884 ships
Victorian-era cruisers of the United Kingdom